The 1986 Hamilton Tiger-Cats season was the 29th season for the team in the Canadian Football League and their 37th overall. The Tiger-Cats finished in 2nd place in the East Division with a 9–8–1 record and won the Grey Cup over the Edmonton Eskimos.

Tiger-Cats owner Harold Ballard claimed to be losing a million dollars a year as owner of the Tiger-Cats. In 1986, Ballard publicly called the Tiger-Cats a bunch of overpaid losers. After the Tiger Cats beat the Toronto Argonauts in the 1986 Eastern Final, Ballard said "You guys may still be overpaid, but after today, no one can call you losers." A few days later, the Tiger-Cats won the 1986 Grey Cup by beating the Edmonton Eskimos 39–15 and Ballard said it was worth every penny.

Mike Kerrigan and Paul Osbaldiston were in their first years with the Tiger-Cats.

Preseason

Regular season

Season standings

Season schedule

Playoffs

Schedule

Grey Cup

References

Hamilton Tiger-Cats seasons
Hamilton
James S. Dixon Trophy championship seasons
Grey Cup championship seasons
Hamilton Tiger-Cats